The Sir Francis Drake Channel is a strait in the British Virgin Islands, separating the main island of Tortola from several smaller islands to the south.  As the name suggests, the channel is named after famed English explorer Sir Francis Drake.

Bodies of water of the British Virgin Islands
Straits of the Caribbean
Francis Drake